James H. Hudson (1877 – August 21, 1947) was an American lawyer and jurist who served as an associate justice of the Maine Supreme Judicial Court from November 20, 1933, to August 21, 1947.

Background 
Born in Guilford, Hudson was admitted to the Maine State Bar in 1903, and entered into private practice in partnership with his father. Hudson was a Piscataquis county attorney from 1913 to 1919. He then served as a Maine probate judge until his appointment to the state supreme court in 1933.

Hudson had a heart attack on August 18, 1947, and died at the Augusta General Hospital.

References

Justices of the Maine Supreme Judicial Court
1877 births
1947 deaths
People from Guilford, Maine